The 2008–09 St. Louis Blues season, the 42nd season for the NHL franchise in St. Louis, Missouri, resulted in the team returning to the NHL Playoffs for the first time since 2004.

Pre-season

Schedule and results

Regular season

Summary 
Before the regular season, started the Blues were hit hard with an injury to defenseman Erik Johnson.  Johnson suffered a leg injury in a golfing accident that put him out for the season.  Despite this the Blues had a good start to the regular season, winning their first opening day game in years, and going 5–3–0, before injuries to Manny Legace and Andy McDonald, coupled with poor defensive play, placed the team in last place in their division at 5–8–1. The Blues would win three games in a row to make their record 9–8–1. On November 24, 2008, Blues President John Davidson announced the Blues had traded Lee Stempniak to the Toronto Maple Leafs for defenseman Carlo Colaiacovo and center Alexander Steen.  On November 30, Keith Tkachuk became the sixth American-born hockey player, and 72nd overall, to score 1,000 points in a career. The point came on a goal scored in his 1,077th game. He now has 511 goals and 489 assists. The goal helped the Blues to a 4–2 victory over the Atlanta Thrashers. It was his 362nd point in a Blues' uniform, ranking him eighth all-time. The Blues would lose their next three games before winning 4–3 over the Phoenix Coyotes. St. Louis would then lose three straight games against teams on the West Coast. The Blues would follow up by losing their next two games to extend their losing streak to five. In that period, defenseman Jay McKee would become another victim of unfortunate injuries for the Blues. The Blues ended the month of December with a poor 4–10–1 record. Just before the All-Star Game break (January 22 to 28), the team gained seven points in their last four games. On February 6, two days after his 36th birthday, goaltender Manny Legace was placed on waivers, and the Blues recalled Chris Holt.

Andy McDonald returned to active status on February 10 after almost three months out with a broken left leg (since November 16) and promptly made his presence felt with an assist on the Blues' first goal, and then later added a goal of his own, against the Vancouver Canucks, although they ultimately lost the game.

A 6–2–4 surge in February pushed the Blues (60 points on Feb. 24) to an even 26–26 (eight overtime loses) record, and to within five points of the eighth and final playoff spot.

In a dramatic and wild 3–1 win, with the final two goals from the youngsters T. J. Oshie and Patrik Berglund late in the wide-open third period, plus 41 saves from Chris Mason, against the Dallas Stars on February 26, pushed the Blues into 12th place in the Western Conference, only three points from a playoff spot and over .500 for the first time since December 8.

A crucial 6–1 run from March 20 to April 2 pushed the Blues into eighth place, capped off by a stunning 5–4 win on April 2 over the Detroit Red Wings, their first victory over Detroit all season. The game was highlighted by David Backes' career-high four-goal night. It was the first four-goal night by any Blues' player since Scott Mellanby did it on March 6, 2003.

A key player in the team's late-season surge was the play of fan favorite T. J. Oshie, who was named NHL Rookie of the Month for March (April 2) after earning 13 points (four goals and nine assists) in 14 games, with the Blues going 9–4–1 in the month. From January 1 through the game on March 29, Oshie scored 11 goals and recorded 20 assists for 31 points in 37 games, leading all rookies, save for Bobby Ryan of the Anaheim Ducks, in that span. His play garnered praise from several Blues veterans, including goaltender Chris Mason: "T. J. is such a tenacious player. In every game he seems to create scoring chances out of nothing." Oshie was also listed #8 on "Hockey's Future Top 50 prospects."

The Blues clinched a playoff spot in their second-to-last game of the season (#81), and their last home game, on April 10, in front of a raucous, standing-room-only crowd of 19,250, beating the Columbus Blue Jackets 3–1 in their 40th win of the season. The defense was superb, giving up only 17 shots, their lowest of the season. This is the first season since 2003–04 the Blues have made the playoffs. In the 2005–06 season, the Blues were in last place overall, and in 2007–08, they were tied for the fourth-worst record in the NHL. The Blues completed one of the greatest late-season playoff surges in NHL history.

On the same day the Blues clinched a playoff spot, their first-round draft pick in 2008, Alex Pietrangelo, 19, was assigned from the Niagara IceDogs in the Ontario Hockey League (OHL) to the Blues' top minor-league affiliate, the Peoria Rivermen of the American Hockey League (AHL).

Divisional standings
Standings

Conference standings

Standings

Schedule and results
 Green background indicates win (2 points).
 Red background indicates regulation loss (0 points).
 White background indicates overtime/shootout loss (1 point).

Playoffs

The St. Louis Blues returned to the NHL Playoffs for the first time since 2004 with a sixth-place finish in the Western Conference. They were swept in four straight games in the first round by the Vancouver Canucks in large part due to the goaltending of Roberto Luongo. It was the first time the Blues were swept in a playoff series since the Dallas Stars did it to them in 1994

Player statistics

Skaters

Goaltenders

†Denotes player spent time with another team before joining Blues. Stats reflect time with Blues only.
‡Traded mid-season. Stats reflect time with Blues only.

Awards and records

Records

Milestones

Transactions

Trades

Free agents

Claimed from waivers

Placed on waivers

Signed prospects
{| cellspacing="8"
| valign="top" |

Contract renewals

Draft picks
St. Louis's picks at the 2008 NHL Entry Draft in Ottawa, Ontario, June 20-June 21, 2008.

See also
2008–09 NHL season
St. Louis Blues seasons
St. Louis (sports)

Farm teams

Peoria Rivermen
The Peoria Rivermen are the Blues American Hockey League affiliate in 2008–09.

Alaska Aces
The Alaska Aces are the Blues affiliate in the ECHL.

References

External links
Official website of the St. Louis Blues
2008-09 St. Louis Blues GAMES
2008-09 St. Louis Blues TEAM and PLAYER Statistics
Internet Hockey DB, Current Player Roster/Stats - St. Louis Blues

St. Louis Blues seasons
S
S
St Louis
St Louis